Andovce is a municipality and village in the Nové Zámky District of the south-west of Slovakia, in the Nitra Region.

History 
In historical records the village was first mentioned in 1424.

Geography 
It has a population of about 1386 people.

Ethnicity 
The population is about 32% Slovak and 68% Hungarian.

People 

 Gergely Czuczor
 Tatiana Vitková

Genealogical resources

The records for genealogical research are available at the state archive "Statny Archiv in Nitra, Slovakia"

 Roman Catholic church records (births/marriages/deaths): 1792-1895
 Census records 1869 of Andovce are available at the state archive.

See also
 List of municipalities and towns in Slovakia

References

External links 
 https://web.archive.org/web/20070513023228/http://www.statistics.sk/mosmis/eng/run.html
Surnames of living people in Andovce
Andovce – Nové Zámky okolie

Villages and municipalities in Nové Zámky District